Lincoln Park Public Schools can refer to:
Lincoln Park Public Schools (Michigan)
Lincoln Park Public Schools (New Jersey)